The  is a suspension bridge in Kure, Hiroshima, Japan that crosses the Seto Inland Sea. It was constructed by Penta-Ocean Construction, at a cost of 50 billion yen.

Overview
The bridge was opened to traffic on 18 January 2000. The bridge is part of Hiroshima Prefecture Route 74, a route that begins in Honshu and crosses over the Seto Inland Sea via the Akinada Bridge to Shimo-kamagari Island to the south. The bridge is tolled and operated by the Hiroshima Prefecture Road Corporation. It is the longest bridge in Japan to be maintained by a prefecture.

References

External links
Picture of bridge at Penta-Ocean Construction Co.
 

Suspension bridges in Japan
Bridges completed in 1999
1999 establishments in Japan